Nitemare 3D is a horror-themed first-person shooter released by Gray Design Associates in 1994 for MS-DOS and Windows 3.x. There are three episodes with the first episode released as shareware and ten levels in each. The full release came on two 3½" floppy disks with a guide to the game's thirty levels. According to author David P. Gray, the game is the first pixelated Windows game to use the WinG interface.

The visuals are similar to those used in Wolfenstein 3D with perpendicular walls and no textures on the floors and ceilings. The music in was composed by David B. Schultz who also composed for Quiver.

Plot
Nitemare 3D follows the story of Hugo, from the Hugo trilogy, a series of graphic adventure PC games consisting of Hugo's House of Horrors, Hugo II, Whodunit?, and Hugo III, Jungle of Doom!. Penelope, Hugo's girlfriend, has been kidnapped by the evil Dr. Hammerstein for use in heinous experiments. Hugo must battle through Hammerstein's bizarre mansion, caverns complete with prisons and laboratories, and finally through a twisted alternate dimension of demons and aliens in an attempt to save her.

Gameplay
Rather than the fast-paced action of Wolfenstein 3D, Nitemare 3D has a slightly slower, more puzzle-oriented style of gameplay. The four weapons (plasma gun, magic wand, pistol, and auto-repeat plasma gun) have different usages—for example, magic blasts are especially useful against magical creatures such as witches, whereas robots are practically immune to them. Meanwhile, vampires take heavy damage from silver bullets, while shrugging off the effects of the plasma gun. Each level in the game has numerous secret panels, some of which were purely for bonuses, but others are essential to completing the level. To make this task easier, the player can collect magic eyes, which enable the player to activate a mini-map in the game's HUD and give hints as to the locations of panels, and crystal balls for displaying the location of enemies.

In a similar vein to id Software's Wolfenstein 3D and Doom, the player character's face is shown on the status bar and acts as a visual reflection of the player's health, although instead of becoming bloodier, the skin wears away, leaving a skull when near death, and a darkened skull when dead, perhaps intentionally similar to the children's game show, Knightmare; It is also similar to the early Catacomb 3-D games.

Reception

References

External links
Official page
Several demo versions of Nightmare-3D, playable online

1994 video games
DOS games
First-person shooters
1990s horror video games
Video games with 2.5D graphics
Windows games
Video games developed in the United States
Sprite-based first-person shooters